The Town Tavern was a jazz club located at 16 Queen Street East in Toronto, Ontario. Operating between 1949 and 1971, it was one of Toronto's preeminent jazz clubs and a regular performance venue for pianist Oscar Peterson.

History
Owned by Sam Berger, the Town Tavern was one of Toronto's busiest jazz clubs throughout the 1950s and 1960s. In July 1958, Oscar Peterson recorded a live album on the Verve label from the Tavern, featuring his then trio composed of Herb Ellis and Ray Brown. The building in which the Tavern operated has since been demolished.

Live recordings
Oscar Peterson - On the Town with the Oscar Peterson Trio (1958)

References
"Town Tavern." In Chef Db.

Music venues in Toronto
Art Deco architecture in Canada
Defunct jazz clubs
Jazz clubs in Toronto
Former music venues in Canada